Post-Quantum Cryptography Standardization is a program and competition by NIST to update their standards to include post-quantum cryptography. It was announced at PQCrypto 2016. 23 signature schemes and 59 encryption/KEM schemes were submitted by the initial submission deadline at the end of 2017 of which 69 total were deemed complete and proper and participated in the first round. Seven of these, of which 3 are signature schemes, have advanced to the third round, which was announced on July 22, 2020.

Background
Academic research on the potential impact of quantum computing dates back to at least 2001. A NIST published report from April 2016 cites experts that acknowledge the possibility of quantum technology to render the commonly used RSA algorithm insecure by 2030. As a result, a need to standardize quantum-secure cryptographic primitives was pursued. Since most symmetric primitives are relatively easy to modify in a way that makes them quantum resistant, efforts have focused on public-key cryptography, namely digital signatures and key encapsulation mechanisms. In December 2016 NIST initiated a standardization process by announcing a call for proposals.

The competition is now in its third round out of expected four, where in each round some algorithms are discarded and others are studied more closely. NIST hopes to publish the standardization documents by 2024, but may speed up the process if major breakthroughs in quantum computing are made.

It is currently undecided whether the future standards be published as FIPS or as NIST Special Publication (SP).

Round one
Under consideration were:
(strikethrough means it had been withdrawn)

Round one submissions published attacks
 Guess Again by Lorenz Panny 
 RVB by Lorenz Panny
 RaCoSS by Daniel J. Bernstein, Andreas Hülsing, Tanja Lange and Lorenz Panny
 HK17 by Daniel J. Bernstein and Tanja Lange
 SRTPI by Bo-Yin Yang
 WalnutDSA 
 by Ward Beullens and Simon R. Blackburn
 by  Matvei Kotov, Anton Menshov and Alexander Ushakov
 DRS by Yang Yu and Léo Ducas 
 DAGS by  Elise Barelli and Alain Couvreur
 Edon-K by  Matthieu Lequesne and Jean-Pierre Tillich
 RLCE by Alain Couvreur, Matthieu Lequesne, and Jean-Pierre Tillich
 Hila5 by Daniel J. Bernstein, Leon Groot Bruinderink, Tanja Lange and Lorenz Panny
Giophantus by Ward Beullens, Wouter Castryck and Frederik Vercauteren
RankSign by Thomas Debris-Alazard and Jean-Pierre Tillich 
McNie by Philippe Gaborit; Terry Shue Chien Lau and Chik How Tan

Round two
Candidates moving on to the second round were announced on January 30, 2019. They are:

Round three
On July 22, 2020, NIST announced seven finalists ("first track"), as well as eight alternate algorithms ("second track"). The first track contains the algorithms which appear to have the most promise, and will be considered for standardization at the end of the third round. Algorithms in the second track could still become part of the standard, after the third round ends. NIST expects some of the alternate candidates to be considered in a fourth round. NIST also suggests it may re-open the signature category for new schemes proposals in the future.

On June 7–9, 2021, NIST conducted the third PQC standardization conference, virtually. The conference included candidates' updates and discussions on implementations, on performances, and on security issues of the candidates. A small amount of focus was spent on intellectual property concerns.

Finalists

Alternate candidates

Intellectual property concerns 

After NIST's announcement regarding the finalists and the alternate candidates, various intellectual property concerns were voiced, notably surrounding lattice-based schemes such as Kyber and NewHope. NIST holds signed statements from submitting groups clearing any legal claims, but there is still a concern that third parties could raise claims. NIST claims that they will take such considerations into account while picking the winning algorithms.

Round three submissions published attacks
 Rainbow: by Ward Beullens on a classical computer

Adaptations 
During this round, some candidates have shown to be vulnerable to some attack vectors. It forces these candidates to adapt accordingly:

 CRYSTAL-Kyber and SABER may change the nested hashes used in their proposals in order for their security claims to hold.
A masking may be added in order to resist the attack. This adaptation affects performance and should be considered while standardizing.

Selected Algorithms 2022 
On July 5, 2022, NIST announced the first group of winners from its six-year competition.

Round four
On July 5, 2022, NIST announced four candidates for PQC Standardization Round 4.

Round four submissions published attacks
 SIKE: by Wouter Castryck and Thomas Decru on a classical computer

See also
 Advanced Encryption Standard process
 CAESAR Competition – Competition to design authenticated encryption schemes
 NIST hash function competition

References

External links
 NIST's official Website on the standardization process
 Post-quantum cryptography website by djb

Cryptography standards
Cryptography contests
Post-quantum cryptography